Vadivelu is an Indian actor, comedian and playback singer. Since the 1990s, he has acted mainly as a comedian in Tamil cinema and is renowned for his slapstick comedies. Vadivelu has won the Tamil Nadu State Film Award for Best Comedian five times for his works in Kaalam Maari Pochu (1996), Vetri Kodi Kattu (2000), Thavasi (2001), Imsai Arasan 23m Pulikesi (2006) and Kathavarayan (2008). He has also won the Filmfare Award for Best Comedian – Tamil two times for his work in Chandramukhi (2005) and Imsai Arasan 23rd Pulikecei (2006). He has won the Vikatan Award for Best Comedian in Pokkiri (2007). He also won the Vijay Award for Best Comedian for his work in Marudhamalai (2007) and was nominated three times in the Best Comedian category for his work in Aadhavan (2009), Nagaram (2010) and Kaavalan (2011). He has acted as a hero in four films in Imsai Arasan 23rd Pulikecei (2006), Indiralohathil Na Azhagappan (2008), Tenaliraman (2014) and Eli (2015).

Films

Discography

References 

Tamil cinema
Indian filmographies
Male actor filmographies
Lists of songs recorded by Indian singers
Discographies of Indian artists